Apodora papuana is a species of python, commonly known as the  Papuan python, Irian python or Papuan olive python. It is found in New Guinea. It is the only species in the genus Apodora. No subspecies are currently recognized.

Description
The available information about the species size is limited. They are noted for having the ability to change color, though the exact mechanism and reasons for it are not completely understood. The color is reputed to change when the snake is agitated. They can vary from black to a mustard yellow, but are normally an olive green in appearance when young and dark olive when older, with the sides and underside distinctly lighter.

Distribution and habitat
Papuan pythons are found in most of New Guinea, from Misool to Fergusson Island. The type locality given is "Ramoi Nova Guinea austro-occidentiali" (Ramoi, near Sorong, Irian Jaya, Indonesia).

Behavior
The Papuan python is largely terrestrial and mostly nocturnal. Despite their size and impressive strength, they are relatively inoffensive animals and are not prone to bite even if handled.

Feeding
Their diet consists primarily of smaller mammals, but they are also known to be partly ophiophagous.

Captivity
The Papuan python is not commonly available in the exotic pet trade, and when they are available they command high prices. They are a relatively hardy species that adapts well to captivity, readily feeding in commercially available rats. Captive breeding has been done.

References

Pythonidae
Monotypic snake genera
Endemic fauna of New Guinea
Snakes of New Guinea
Reptiles of Papua New Guinea
Reptiles of Western New Guinea
Taxa named by Arnold G. Kluge